Kakkar or Kakar is an Indian surname. The Kakkar clan belongs to the Khatri caste. They are a part of the Barah Ghar/ Bahri sub-caste of Khatris that also includes the clans of Chopra, Dhawan, Kapoor, Khanna, Mehra, Malhotra, Sehgal, Seth, Tandon, Talwar, and Vohra. The clan has also taken up the title of "Seth".

According to historian R.C. Dogra and Baij Nath Puri, Kakkar is derived from the word "Karkar" meaning strong or powerful. As a tradition, Kakkar Khatris neither wash , shave nor change their clothes , or begin any new business in Phagan (February) month

Notable People 
Notable people bearing the name Kakkar include:
Akriti Kakar, (born 1986) Indian singer
Dipika Kakar, (Born 1986), Indian Television Actress
Neha Kakkar (born 1988), Indian playback singer
Prahlad Kakkar (born 1950), Indian Indian ad film director and media personality
Prakriti Kakar, (born 1995) Indian playback singer
Sonu Kakkar, (born 1986), Indian playback singer
Sudhir Kakar, (born 1938) Indian Psychoanalyst, novelist and author
Tony Kakkar, (born 1984) Indian playback singer

See also
Kakkar Subdistrict
Kakar
Kekkar

References

Surnames of Indian origin
Punjabi tribes
Indian surnames
Punjabi-language surnames
Hindu surnames
Khatri clans
Khatri surnames